Céline Buckens (born 9 August 1996) is a Belgian and British actress. After appearing in the film War Horse (2011), she went on to play Mia MacDonald in the Netflix series Free Rein (2017–2019) and Sophie Mercer in the Cinemax series Warrior (2020). For her performance in the BBC drama Showtrial (2021), she was nominated for a British Academy Television Award. She also starred in the Paramount+ drama The Ex-Wife (2022).

Early life
Buckens was born on 9 August 1996 in Brussels and moved to the England at a young age, where she grew up in Kensington, London. She attended Thomas's London Day School and St Mary's, Ascot. She then studied History at the London School of Economics and Political Science; she appeared in Free Rein while completing her course. Buckens was also a debutante at the Bal des débutantes in Paris.

Career
Buckens' acting career began when she portrayed Émilie in Steven Spielberg's 2011 film War Horse, a role she won after two auditions. The character is a young French girl who lives on a farm with her grandfather after she lost her parents in the war. In 2015, Buckens starred in a short film titled The Rain Collector, as Vanessa Kentworth.

From 2017 to 2019, Buckens starred in the Netflix drama series Free Rein as Mia MacDonald. She also appeared in an episode of the ITV drama Endeavour in 2017, as Daisy Bennett. In 2018, she starred in Ne M'oublie Pas (English: Forget Me Not), a French short film, as the lead character Elsa. In November 2019, she appeared in the drama thriller film The Good Liar as Annalise. In May 2019, it was announced that Buckens had joined the main cast of the Cinemax action series Warrior. She portrays the role of Sophie Mercer from the second series onwards. In 2021, she portrayed Talitha Campbell in the BBC legal drama Showtrial. For her portrayal of the role, she was nominated for the British Academy Television Award for Best Supporting Actress. Buckens also made her directorial debut in 2021 after directing the short film Prangover, for which she was awarded Best Director at the 2021 North East International Film Festival.

Filmography

Awards and nominations

References

External links
 

1996 births
Actresses from Brussels
Actresses from London
Alumni of the London School of Economics
British child actresses
Belgian emigrants to the United Kingdom
Belgian film actresses
Belgian television actresses
British film actresses
British people of Belgian descent
British television actresses
British debutantes
Debutantes of le Bal des débutantes
People educated at St Mary's School, Ascot
People from Kensington
Living people
21st-century Belgian actresses
21st-century British actresses